Throughout history, armed priests or soldier priests have been recorded. Distinguished from military chaplains who served the military or civilians as spiritual guidance (non-combatants), these priests took up arms and fought in conflicts (combatants). The term warrior priests or war priests is usually used for armed priests of the antiquity and Middle Ages, and of historical tribes.

History
In Greek mythology, the Curetes were identified as armed priests. In Ancient Rome, the Salii who were armed priests carried sacred shields through the city during the March festivals.
Livy (59 BC–17 AD) mentions armati sacerdotes (armed priests). 

Medieval European canon law said that a priest could not be a soldier, and vice versa. Priests were allowed on the battlefield as chaplains, and could only defend themselves with clubs.

The Aztecs had a vanguard of warrior priests who carried deity banners and made sacrifices on the battlefield.

The warrior-priest was a common figure in the First Serbian Uprising (1804–13). Several archpriests and priests were commanders in the uprising. Serbian Orthodox monasteries sent monks to join the ranks of the Serbian Army.

Legacy
The "Pyrrhic" dance in Crete is said to have been the ritual dance of armed priests.

Notable groups
Chivalric military orders, Christian religious societies of knights of the Catholic Church in feudal Europe such as the Knights Templar, the Knights Hospitaller, the Teutonic Knights and many others.

Sōhei, Buddhist monks in feudal Japan

Shaolin Monk, Chen, Zen Buddhist monks in feudal China

Righteous armies, Korean guerilla fighters, including monks, who resisted the Japanese invasions of Korea (1592–98).

Sant Sipahi is a Sikh ideology, inspired by the lives of Sikh gurus, of a saint soldier who would adhere one's life in strict discipline both in mind and body.

Naga Sadhus, a militaristic sect of arms-bearing Hindu sannyasi.

Notable people

Eastern Orthodoxy
Luka Lazarević (1774–1852), Serbian Orthodox priest, vojvoda (general) of the Serbian Revolution.
Matija Nenadović (1777–1854), Serbian Orthodox archpriest, commander in the Serbian Revolution.
Athanasios Diakos (1788–1821), Greek Orthodox priest, commander in the Greek War of Independence.
Mićo Ljubibratić (1839–1889), Serbian Orthodox priest, fought in the Herzegovina Uprising.
Bogdan Zimonjić (1813–1909), Serbian Orthodox priest, active during the 1852–62 and 1875–78 uprisings in Herzegovina
Vukajlo Božović, Serbian Orthodox archpriest, fought in the Balkan Wars.
Jovan Grković-Gapon (1879–1912), Serbian Orthodox priest, guerrilla in Macedonia.
Tasa Konević, Serbian Orthodox priest, guerrilla in Macedonia.
Mihailo Dožić (1848–1914), Serbian Orthodox priest, guerrilla in Potarje (1875–78).
Stevan Dimitrijević (1866–1953), Serbian Orthodox priest, guerrilla in Macedonia (fl. 1904).
Momčilo Đujić (1907–1999), Serbian Orthodox priest, World War II Chetnik.
Vlada Zečević (1903–1970), Serbian Orthodox priest, Yugoslav Partisan.
Dimitrios Holevas (1907–2001), Greek Orthodox priest, World War II Greek Resistance.
Germanos Dimakos (1912–2004), Greek Orthodox priest, World War II Greek Resistance.

Catholicism
Archbishop Turpin (d. 800), legendary (insofar as military accomplishments) member of Charlemagne's Twelve Peers.
Heahmund (d. 871), Bishop of Sherborne, died at the Battle of Meretun under Aethelred I of Wessex against the Great Heathen Army.
Cresconius, (c. 1036–1066), Bishop of Iria, Spanish bishop who fought Vikings raider.
Odo of Bayeux (d. 1097), Bishop of Bayeux, half-brother of William the Conqueror
Rudolf of Zähringen (1135–1191), Catholic bishop, Crusader.
Absalon (1128-1201), Catholic archbishop, Crusader.
Joscius (d. 1202), Catholic archbishop, Crusader.
Reginald of Bar (fl. 1182–1216), Catholic bishop, Crusader.
Aubrey of Reims (fl. 1207–18), Catholic archbishop, Crusader.
Arnaud Amalric (d. 1225), Cistercian abbott, Crusader.
Bernardino de Escalante (1537–after 1605), Catholic priest
Luka Ibrišimović (1620-1698), Francisian monk, Croatian spy and anti-Ottoman fighter in Great Turkish War
Marko Mesić c. (1640-1713) Croatian priest and anti-Ottoman fighter in Great Turkish War
John Murphy (priest) (1753 – c. 2 July 1798), Irish Catholic priest and one of the leaders of the Irish Rebellion of 1798. Captured, tortured and executed by British Crown forces.
José María Morelos (1765–1815), Roman Catholic priest, Mexican independentist commander.
José Félix Aldao (1785–1845), Dominican friar, General in the Argentine War.
Antanas Mackevičius (1828–1863), Lithuanian Catholic priest and one of the military commanders in the Uprising of 1863.
Stanisław Brzóska (1832-1865), Polish Catholic priest, head chaplain and one of the generals in January Uprising.
Georges Thierry d'Argenlieu (1889-1964), Discalced Carmelite friar and priest, French naval officer, eventually admiral. As High Commissioner of the French Fourth Republic in the Far East after World War 2, set in motion the First Indochina War.
Camilo Torres Restrepo (1929-1966), Colombian socialist guerrilla and Catholic priest.
Gaspar García Laviana (1941-1978), Catholic priest inspired by Liberation theology to join the Sandanista revolution as a guerrilla soldier.

Anglicanism
Leonidas Polk (1806-1864), Confederate General, United States Military Academy graduate, Episcopal bishop of Louisiana 

Other
The tlatoani, ruler of Nahuatl pre-Hispanic states, were high priests and military commanders.
 Dutty Boukman (d. 1791), voodoo priest and Haitian Revolution leader.

See also

Religious war
Sacred king
Warrior monk

References

Sources